Laurence Christian Reynolds (born 5 March 1992) is an English professional footballer who is currently a free agent. He also works a full-time school teacher.

Career statistics

Club

Notes

References

External links
 Yau Yee Football League profile

Living people
1992 births
English footballers
Association football midfielders
Hong Kong Premier League players
Hong Kong FC players
English expatriate footballers
English expatriate sportspeople in Hong Kong
Expatriate footballers in Hong Kong